Kim van Kooten (born 26 January 1974 in Purmerend, North Holland) is a Dutch actress and screenwriter. In international cinema, she is best known for the 2003 Dutch/US co-production Phileine Says Sorry, filmed partly in New York City, in which she plays the lead. She is the author of the script of the very successful Dutch movie Alles is Liefde (Everything is Love), and won a Golden Calf for Best Actress in Phileine Says Sorry (2003), and for Best Scenario with Met grote blijdschap (2001).

Life and work 
Van Kooten grew up in Zuidoostbeemster. She is the daughter of Kees van Kooten and Barbara Kits. Her brother is the actor and singer Kasper van Kooten.

She studied screenwriting at the Film Academy in Holland, but dropped out in the first year. After a chance meeting with director Robert Jan Westdijk, van Kooten made her acting debut in the film Zusje (Little Sister). These were followed by films such as Jesus is een Palestijn (Jesus is a Palestinian) (with her then boyfriend Hans Teeuwen), Mariken and Phileine Zegt Sorry (for which she won a Golden Calf for Best Actress).

She is also a screenwriter and was asked by Theo van Gogh to do the script for the film Blind Date. She now specialises in working with characters and real-life dialogue.

Besides being an actress and writer, van Kooten worked as an editor and presenter for the cinema programme Stardust for the Dutch television network VPRO. She now is the star of a new dramedy show called Evelien, shown on Net 5.

She has written the script of the successful Dutch movie Alles is Liefde (Everything is Love). The movie has been seen over a million times, which resulted in a Diamanten film award. Later, it received a Dutch Golden Calves award for best Dutch movie. She is married to actor Jacob Derwig, with whom she has two children, Roman and Kee Molly (born 17 December 2007). They met on the set of the TV-series De acteurs (The actors), where various actors played different roles written by Van Kooten.

Filmography

As an actress
 1995: Zusje as Daantje Zuidewind
 1996: Red Rain
 1998: Een Hoertje en haar broertje as Elena
 1999: Jezus is een Palestijn as Natasja
 2000: Mariken as Isabella
 2001: Olivetti 82
 2002: Snapshots
 2002: Bella Bettien as Monique
 2003: Phileine zegt sorry as Phileine
 2006: Evelien (TV-series) as Evelien
 2010: Loft
 2012: Black Out
 2013: The Dinner

She also voices one of the characters in the movie Undercover Kitty (2001).

As a screenwriter
 1994: Nighthawks
 1996: Blind Date (dialogs)
 2000: Mariken (with role for her brother Kasper van Kooten)
 2001: Met grote blijdschap
 2001: Acteurs, De (television series)
 2002/2003: musical: Na de zomer (in cooperation with songwriter Niek Barendsen)
 2007: Alles is Liefde
 2012: "Entertainment Experience"

External links

References

1974 births
Living people
People from Purmerend
Dutch film actresses
Dutch television actresses
Golden Calf winners
20th-century Dutch actresses
21st-century Dutch actresses